Sudani from Nigeria is a 2018 Indian Malayalam-language sports drama film written and directed by Zakariya Mohammed , with dialogues co-written by Muhsin Parari. Shyju Khalid was the cinematographer, who also produced the film with Sameer Thahir. It stars Soubin Shahir and Samuel Abiola Robinson. The story follows a Nigerian football player who joins a club in Malappuram, Kerala for a sevens football tournament.

Sudani from Nigeria was released in India on 23 March 2018. It met with widely positive critical response and was a commercial success at the box office. The film won five awards at the 2018 Kerala State Film Awards, including Best Screenplay, Best Film with Popular Appeal and Aesthetic Value, Best Debut Director, Best Actor (Shahir), and Best Character Actress (Savithri and Sarasa). At the 2018 National Film Awards, it won the award for Best Feature Film in Malayalam and Savithri Sreedharan received a Special Mention for her performance in the film. It was included in The Hindu's top 25 Malayalam films of the decade.

Plot 
The movie is set in a rural town in Malappuram district in the state of Kerala in India. Majeed is an unmarried young man who is rejected due to of his lack of a well paying and constant job. Majeed, like many people in his town, has an enormous passion for football and is even a manager of a local team, named 'MYC Accode', which participates in Sevens matches. He manages to recruit three Nigerian talented players to his team, who catapults the team's talent and fame. Although successful in matches, Majeed, his friends and players are financially set-back.

Due to an unfortunate accident, the team's star player Samuel "Sudu" Robinson is hospitalised and is forced to rest for a month while he recovers. Afraid he'll not be able to afford the hospital charges, Majeed decides to let Samuel rest at the former's house, where he and his mother are the only inhabitants with occasional visits from his step-father who works as a security guard. Samuel becomes a spectacle for the townsfolk and many people visit the recovering "Sudani from Nigeria". Majeed and Samuel bond over time and share their personal life stories with each other.

Majeed hates and does not talk to his step-father due to emotional attachment with his late father. He also resents his mother for marrying a second time following the death of her husband (she agreed due to pressure from family and relatives), and refuses to talk to her unless absolutely necessary. Samuel on the other hand lost both his parents in the civil war and lived in a refugee camp with his grandmother and two sisters. Samuel only left in hopes of being able to financially support his family. Trouble comes looking for them when an article in the newspaper, showing a recovering Samuel, Majeed, his friends and neighbours, attracts the attention of Police officials who come asking for Samuel and his passport.

Samuel learns that his grandmother has passed away, and wants to immediately leave in order to be with his sisters who were left alone. Chaos ensues when they discover the passport to be missing, and Majeed and his friends looks for it everywhere they could've kept it, but in vain. Majeed decides to apply for a duplicate passport, prompting Samuel to reveal that his passport is a fake. He was not able to legally acquire a passport due to him being a refugee and so had to forge a fake one in order to leave for India. The passport is eventually recovered and Majeed manages to buy a ticket for Samuel to Nigeria.

Samuel bids the town and Majeed an emotional farewell and leaves. Returning from the airport, Majeed decides to mend his relationship with his family. He meets his step-father and brings him back home to his mother's surprise and happiness.

Cast 
 Soubin Shahir as Majeed
 Samuel Abiola Robinson as Samuel Abiola Robinson, a football player from Nigeria.
 Aneesh G. Menon as Nizar
 K. T. C. Abdullah  as Majeed's stepfather.
 Savithri Sreedharan as Jameela, Majeed's mother.
 Sarasa Balussery as Beeyumma
 Lukman Lukku as Rajesh
 Abhiram Pothuval as Kunjippa
 Navas Vallikkunnu as Latheef
 Sidheek Kodiyathur as Naserkka
 Ashraf Thangal as Bavakka
 Mashar Hamsa as Puthiyapla
 Ashraf Hamsa as Doctor
 Najeeb Kuttippuram as Activist
 Hikmathulla as Journalist
 Unni Nair as Unni Nair
 Nasar Karutheni as Muthu Kaku
 Aroop as Shahid

Production
The film was produced by cinematographers Sameer Thahir and Shyju Khalid and directed by debutant Zakariya. Soubin Shahir co-star along with Nigerian actor Samuel Abiola Robinson. With an idea to make an independent film, Zakariya Muhammed initially approached cinematographer-director Rajeev Ravi to find out if he could produce the film under his company Collective Phase One. Ravi suggested to make the film in a bigger scale and that Shahir would be apt for the role of Majeed. Ravi himself contacted Shahir for the film. Later, Muhsin Parari, who co-wrote the dialogues insisted Zakariya to approach Thahir, who agreed to produce the film with Khalid. Zakariya found Robinson through internet.

The film is set in that backdrop of Sevens football matches held during November in the Malabar region of Kerala, but according to Zakariya, it is not a sports film, rather a "comic family drama". The film marks Robinson's debut foreign film. He plays Samuel, a Nigerian footballer brought to Kerala to play the sevens football match in Malappuram. Shahir plays his manager, Majeed. Despite Nigeria being popular for football, Robinson was not interested in the game, he said: "I belong to the 0.001 per cent population of my country that is not interested in football". He underwent training in Kerala. The film had a 35-day long shoot in Malappuram, few scenes were shot in Nigeria and Ghana.

Music
The film features songs composed by Rex Vijayan and Shahabaz Aman. Aman wrote and composed the song "Kurrah" many years ago for a documentary. Rex re-arranged the song for the film.

Release
Sudani from Nigeria was released in India on 23 March 2018. The film dubbed in Telugu with same title and released on Aha

Critical response
The New Indian Express rated the film 4 out of 5 stars and wrote: "Very few stories cleanse your heart like Sudani from Nigeria. It is hard not to be swayed by the humanity here. Very few can leave the theatres without their eyes welled up. Sudani from Nigeria is one of the best movies made this year". Sify gave the verdict "heart-warming and honest" and added that "Sudani from Nigeria has been competently packaged and is a gripping tale. It's one of the finest movies that has come in Malayalam during recent times that steals your heart in a big way". Malayala Manorama awarded 3.5 in a scale of 5 and commented: "The 2-hour show is a delightful watch and viewers will have enough reasons to be awestruck as well as to laugh their hearts out". Rating 3.5 out of 5 stars, The Times of India wrote that "Sudani from Nigeria might not have big names to boast of but it’s got everything in its right place, be it comedy, sentiments, thrills or tears". Movie Critic Veeyen rated the film 'Excellent' and stated that "Heartbreaking, hilarious and hopeful by turns, ‘Sudani from Nigeria’ is a glorious triumph whichever way you look at it, be it the exemplary performances, the proficient scripting or the competent direction". He added that "..Words would probably do little justice to this gem of a film, that should not, at any cost be missed in the theatres." Baradwaj Rangan of Film Companion South wrote "The film is a heart-warming celebration of humanity, but not in the overblown, vulgar, “triumph of the spirit” mode that Hollywood specialises in."

Box office
The film grossed 13.46 crore in less than a month from Kerala box office, with a distributor's share of 5.42 crore. It performed well at Indian domestic multiplexes (particularly in home state Kerala) and in gulf countries. Made at a budget of 90 lakhs, the film collected nearly 18 crore from Kerala alone with an estimated distributor's share of 6 – 6.5 crore. Sudani from Nigeria was the highest-grossing Malayalam film among the summer (March – May 2018) releases. It grossed $758,462 from the United Arab Emirates in three weekends.

Payment dispute 
After the release of the film, actor Samuel alleged the producers that he was underpaid because of racism. He added that more money is promised if the movie become success, but no additional payment was given, despite the film being a success. Producers responded that the film was a low budget one and they will give more money once box office collections are finalized. They also added that racial allegations were unfortunate. Later Samuel informed that all issues were solved and racial discrimination allegations were all a misunderstanding.

Accolades

Notes

References

External links 
 

2010s Malayalam-language films
Indian association football films
2010s sports drama films
Films set in Nigeria
Indian sports drama films
Films scored by Shahabaz Aman
Films scored by Rex Vijayan
Best Malayalam Feature Film National Film Award winners
2018 drama films